Gerald Shapiro may refer to:

 Gerald Shapiro (writer) (1950–2011), American writer
 Gerald Shapiro (composer) (born 1942), American composer

See also
Gary Shapiro (disambiguation)